The JetCat P400 is a small turbojet engine manufactured by JetCat and used to power fixed-wing model aircraft and some jet packs.

Applications
 Jet wingpack
 Lockheed Martin X-56

Specifications

References

Microjet engines